Cell Broadcast (CB) is a method of sending messages to multiple mobile telephone users in a defined area at the same time. It is defined by the ETSI’s GSM committee and 3GPP and is part of the 2G, 3G, 4G LTE (telecommunication) and 5G standards. It is also known as Short Message Service-Cell Broadcast (SMS-CB) or CB SMS.

Unlike Short Message Service-Point to Point (SMS-PP), Cell Broadcast is a one-to-many geo-targeted and geo-fenced messaging service.

History
Cell Broadcast messaging was first demonstrated in Paris in 1997. Some mobile operators used Cell Broadcast for communicating the area code of the antenna cell to the mobile user (via channel 050), for nationwide or citywide alerting, weather reports, mass messaging, location-based news, etc. Cell broadcast has been widely deployed since 2008 by major  Asian, US, Canadian, South American and European network operators. Not all operators have the Cell Broadcast messaging function activated in their network yet, but most of the currently used handsets support cell broadcast, however on many devices it is disabled by default and there isn't a standardised interface to enable the feature.

Technology
One Cell Broadcast message can reach a large number of telephones at once. Cell Broadcast messages are directed to radio cells, rather than to a specific telephone. The latest generation of Cell Broadcast Systems (CBS) can send to the whole mobile network (e.g. 1,000,000 cells) in less than 10 seconds, reaching millions of mobile subscribers at the same time. A Cell Broadcast message is an unconfirmed push service, meaning that the originators of the messages do not know who has received the message, allowing for services based on anonymity. Cell Broadcast is compliant with the latest EU General Data Protection Regulation (GDPR) as mobile phone numbers are not required by CB. The originator (alerting authority) of the Cell Broadcast message can request the success rate of a message. In such a case the Cell Broadcast System will respond with the number of addressed cells and the number of cells that have broadcast the Cell broadcast (alert) message.

The CB message parameters contain the broadcasting schedule. If the start-time is left open, the CBC system will assume an immediate start, which will be the case for Public Warning messages. If the end-time is left open, the message will be repeated indefinitely. A subsequent cancel message shall be used to stop this message. The repetition rate can be set between 2 seconds and to values beyond 30 minutes.  Each repeated CB message will have the same message identifier (indicating the source of the message), and the same serial number. Using this information, the mobile telephone is able to identify and ignore broadcasts of already received messages.

A Cell Broadcast message page is composed of 82 octets, which, using the default character set, can encode 93 characters. Up to 15 of these pages may be concatenated to form a Cell Broadcast message (hence maximum length of one Cell broadcast message is therefore 1395 characters).

A Cell Broadcast Centre (CBC), a system which is the source of SMS-CB, is connected to a Base Station Controller (BSC) in GSM networks, to a Radio Network Controller (RNC) in UMTS networks, to a Mobility Management Entity (MME) in LTE (telecommunication) networks or to a core Access and Mobility management Function (AMF) in 5G networks.

The technical implementation of the cell broadcast service is described in the 3GPP specification TS 23.041 

The 2G-CBC (BSC) interface is described in 3GPP standard TS 48.049; however, non-standard implementations exist.
The 3G-CBC (RNC) interface is described in 3GPP standard TS 25.419.
The 4G-CBC (MME) interface is described in 3GPP standard TS 29.168.
The 5G-CBC (AMF) interface is described in 3GPP standard TS 29.518.

A CBC sends CB messages, a list of cells where messages are to be broadcast, and the requested repetition rate and number of times they shall be broadcast to the BSC/RNC/MME/AMF. The BSC's/RNC's/MME/AMF responsibility is to deliver the CB messages to the base station (BTSs), NodeBs, ENodeBs and gNodeBs which handle the requested cells.

Emergency communication system
Cell Broadcast is not affected by traffic load; therefore, it is very suitable during a disaster when load spikes of data (social media and mobile app), regular SMS and voice calls usage (mass call events) tend to significantly congest mobile networks, as multiple events have shown.

Broadcast messages are used in most countries to send emergency alerts, using as input a CAP (Common Alerting Protocol) message as specified by OASIS (organization) or Wireless Emergency Alerts (WEA) C-interface protocol, which has been specified jointly by the Alliance for Telecommunications Industry Solutions (ATIS) and the Telecommunications Industry Association (TIA).

Advantages of using Cell Broadcast for Public warning are:

 Sending out a Cell Broadcast message to a few or millions of people takes less than 10 seconds
 Cell Broadcast has a unique and dedicated ringtone and vibration
 Only an authorized authority and the serving mobile network are able to send out the Cell Broadcast messages
 99% of all handsets used today support Cell Broadcast 
 Cell Broadcast supports per CB-message a maximum message length of 1395 characters in Latin and 615 characters in Universal Coded Character Set (UCS-2) encoding in order to support e.g. Arabic, Chinese alphabet, Urdu, Greek alphabet.
 Cell Broadcast supports multiple languages
 Cell Broadcast supports the use of URLs and Web-links in the alert message
 Cell Broadcast supports Device Based Geo-Fencing
 Cell Broadcast supports the update within seconds of existing alert messages due to changing hazard situations
 Cell Broadcast supports the mechanism to inform and instruct people within seconds in the adjacent hazard areas
 Cell Broadcast is able to reach all mobile subscribers including roaming subscribers (in their own language)
 Cell Broadcast is not affected by mobile network congestion
 Cell Broadcast is not affected by access class baring and or SIM class baring 
 Cell Broadcast is not affected by any data protection constraints as no personal data (subscriber identity or MSISDN) is required and used to deliver the message.
 Cell Broadcast can be used to address people present in an individual cell sector or large polygons covering a complete city or country.
 Cell Broadcast messages can be updated as incident conditions change during an event at the end of an event an all-clear can be given.
 Cell Broadcast is suitable for monthly or half yearly national public warning awareness tests
 Cell Broadcast enablement in the mobile network has no influence on the battery life of mobile devices

Cell Broadcast adoption rate
A point of criticism in the past on Cell Broadcast was that there was no uniform user experience on all mobile devices in a country.

Wireless Emergency Alerts and Government alerts using Cell Broadcast are supported in most models of mobile telephones. Some smart phones have a configuration menu that offer opt-out capabilities for certain public warning severity levels.

In case a national civil defence organisation is adopting one of the Wireless Emergency Alerts standards, WEA - formerly known as CMAS in North America, EU-Alert in Europe, LAT-Alert in South America, Earthquake Tsunami Warning System in Japan, each subscriber in that country either making use of the home network or is roaming automatically makes use of the embedded Public warning Cell Broadcast feature present in every Android (operating system) and iOS mobile device.

In countries that have selected Cell Broadcast to transmit public warning messages, up to 99% of the handsets receive the cell broadcast message (reaching between 85-95% of the entire population as not all people have a mobile phone) within seconds after the government authorities have submitted the message; see as examples Emergency Mobile Alert (New Zealand), Wireless Emergency Alerts (USA) and NL-Alert (Netherlands).

Public warning implementations

Many countries and regions have implemented location-based alert systems based on cell broadcast. The alert messages to the population, already broadcast by various media, are relayed over the mobile network using cell broadcast.

Australia - Emergency Alert Australia
Canada - Alert Ready
Chile - Sistema de Alerta de Emergencias (SAE)
Denmark - Put into operation June 2022.
European Union - EU-Alert
France - FR-Alert
Germany (MoWaS) (see also Wireless Emergency Alerts in Germany)
Greece - GR-Alert
Hong Kong - emergency alert system (EAS)  first used on March 9, 2022.
Iran
Japan - Earthquake Early Warning
Lithuania - LT-Alert 
Netherlands - NL-Alert
New Zealand - Emergency Mobile Alert
Norway - Nødvarsel
Oman - Oman-Alert
Philippines - Emergency Cell Broadcast System (ECBS)
Romania - RO-ALERT
Saudi Arabia - KSA-Alert 
South Korea - Korean Public Alert Service (used daily for regional COVID numbers and additionally almost daily for example to inform about the temporary closure of a metro line, missing people or cold weather)
Sri Lanka - Disaster and Emergency Warning Network (DEWN)
Taiwan - Public Warning Cell Broadcast Service 
Turkey - UYARSİS
Ukraine - currently being tested
United Arabic Emirates - UAE-Alert
United States - Wireless Emergency Alerts

Countries in the process of implementation 

The following countries and regions have selected Cell Broadcast to use for their national public warning system but are currently in the process of implementing.

 Australia
 Italy (delayed)
 Mexico
 Peru
 Portugal
 Spain (ES-Alert)
 Ukraine
 United Kingdom (see also Mobile phone alerts in the United Kingdom)

References

External links

3GPP - The current standardization body for GSM with free standards available
3GPP TS 23.041 Technical realization of Cell Broadcast Service (CBS)
3GPP TS 25.419 UTRAN Iu-BC interface: Service Area Broadcast Protocol (SABP)
3GPP TS 44.012 Short Message Service Cell Broadcast (SMSCB) support on the mobile radio interface
3GPP TS 45.002 Multiplexing and multiple access on the radio path
3GPP TS 48.049 BSC-CBC interface specification; Cell Broadcast Service Protocol (CBSP)
3GPP TS 29.168 Cell Broadcast Centre interfaces with the Evolved Packet Core; Stage 3

Mobile telecommunications standards
3GPP standards
Emergency population warning systems
Emergency communication